DouYu is a Chinese video live streaming service. The site is the largest of its kind in China with 163.6 million monthly active users in 2019,
more than the 140 million monthly active users of Twitch.
In July 2019 DouYu International Holdings Ltd raised $21 million through U.S. initial public offering (IPO) and it listed itself on the New York Stock Exchange (Nasdaq) with the stock symbol DOYU. It was the largest IPO of any Chinese company on Wall Street in 2019.

In 2018 Douyu made $21 million in advertisement revenues. Tencent owns about 21% of the shares.

See also 
 Huya Live

References

External links 
  

Chinese brands
Chinese entertainment websites
Video game streaming services
Video hosting
Video on demand services
Software companies of China
Companies listed on the Nasdaq